Waitin' to Inhale is the fourth solo album by Rap-A-Lot Records artist, Devin the Dude. The album peaked at #30 on the Billboard 200, making this his highest charting album to date. It features high-profile guest appearances from André 3000, Snoop Dogg, Lil Wayne, and Bun B. As of December 2007, the album has sold 165,000 copies.

Track listing

Samples
"Broccoli & Cheese"
"Forever Mine" by The O'Jays
"Don't Wanna Be Alone"
"Alone" by Ohio Players
"Lil' Girl Gone"
"Diana" by Eugene Wilde
"She Useta Be"
"Latin Reaction" by Gato Barbieri

Charts

Weekly charts

Year-end charts

References

2007 albums
Devin the Dude albums
Rap-A-Lot Records albums